is a Japanese professional footballer who plays as a midfielder for  club Kashiwa Reysol.

Youth career
Representing Nippon Sport Science University Kashiwa High School, Tsuchiya primarily played as a centre-back and captained the team in his third year to a second place finish in the Kanto tournament.

Club career
In September 2021 it was announced that Tsuchiya would be joining the first-team squad of Kashiwa Reysol for the 2022 season. He made his debut on 13 April 2022, playing 90 minutes in a 3–1 J.League Cup victory against Sagan Tosu. He scored his first goal for the club in June 2022, scoring an equalizing goal in an eventual 2–1 win in the third round of the Emperor's Cup against Tokushima Vortis.

Career statistics

Club

International career
In February 2022, Tsuchiya was called up to the Japan U-19 squad.

References

External links
Profile at Kashiwa Reysol
Soccerway

2003 births
Living people
Association football people from Tochigi Prefecture
Japanese footballers
Association football midfielders
Kashiwa Reysol players